Htay Kywe may refer to:

 Htay Kywe (activist) (born 1968), Burmese pro-democracy activist
 Htay Kywe (politician) (1951–2020), Burmese politician